Connie Colla is an American former television news anchor and host. She has anchored in San Diego, Phoenix, and Philadelphia, and has filled in on Weekend Today on NBC. Colla also played a television reporter in the movie Law Abiding Citizen, starring Jaime Foxx and Gerard Butler. She now works as a realtor in Scottsdale, Arizona.

Early life

Colla was born in Great Falls, Montana and graduated from Montana State University.

Career

Colla moved to Arizona in 2009 to anchor the morning and midday news at KNXV-TV in Phoenix. She left the channel to start her own real estate company; her last day at the station was December 4, 2014.

Colla is a member of the National Association of Realtors and National Academy of Television Arts and Sciences, and is a former board member for Ronald McDonald House Charities of Phoenix and Associated Services for the Blind in Philadelphia.  Most of her other charity work focuses on women and children. For eight years Colla hosted "The Children's Miracle Network Celebration" on TV for the Children's Hospital of Philadelphia.

Colla has been a guest cooking host on The Fretz Kitchen, a nationally syndicated cooking show. She has won several Emmy awards for her work during her career.

Personal life
Colla lives in Scottsdale, Arizona with her two children.

References

Television anchors from Philadelphia
Television anchors from San Diego
Year of birth missing (living people)
Living people
Montana State University alumni
Real estate brokers
People from Great Falls, Montana
American women television journalists
21st-century American women